LinuxTag (the name is a compound with the German Tag meaning assembly, conference or meeting) is a free software exposition with an emphasis on Linux (but also BSD), held annually in Germany. LinuxTag claims to be Europe's largest exhibition for "open source software" and aims to provide a comprehensive overview of the Linux and free software market, and to promote contacts between users and developers. LinuxTag is one  of the world's most important events of this kind.

LinuxTag's slogan, "Where .COM meets .ORG", refers to its stated aim of bringing together  commercial and non-commercial groups in the IT sector. Each year's event also has its own subtitle.

Promotion of free software 
LinuxTag sees itself as part of the free software movement, and promotes this community in an extraordinary degree by supporting numerous open source projects. LinuxTag offers a way for these projects to promote their software and their concepts, and thus present themselves to the public in an appropriate manner, with their own booths, forums and lectures. The goal is to encourage projects to share concepts and content to the benefit of other groups and companies, and to provide forums for in-depth discussions of new technologies and opportunities.

LinuxTag e.V. 
The non-profit association "LinuxTag e.V." was founded in preparation for LinuxTag's move from Kaiserslautern to the University of Stuttgart in 2000. The association plans and organizes the LinuxTag event by volunteer work and guides its ideological development. The association LinuxTag e.V. is registered in Association Register VR 2239 of the Kaiserslautern District Court. The association manages the LinuxTag name and word mark. The purpose of the association, according to its bylaws, is "the promotion of Free Software", and is pursued through the organization of the LinuxTag events.

The association is represented by a three-person executive board, supplemented by several representatives with delegated authority. All members of the LinuxTag association are volunteers and receive no remuneration for their service. (In 2005, the First Chairman and CFO were employed and remunerated by the association from 1 April until 31 July.) Surpluses resulting from the LinuxTag events or from sponsorship are reinvested in the association's non-profit activities.

History 
LinuxTag was launched in 1996 by a handful of active members of the Unix Working Group (Unix-AG) at the University of Kaiserslautern. They wanted to inform the public about the young technology of Linux and Open Source software. The first LinuxTag event only drew a small number of participants. Since then, however, the event has changed venues several times to keep pace with rapidly growing numbers of exhibitors and visitors.

Kaiserslautern 
The first LinuxTag conference and exhibition was held at the University of Technology in Kaiserslautern.

LinuxTag 1996 - 1999 
The first LinuxTag was a theme night on Linux. In 1998, LinuxTag drew 3,000 visitors. In 1999 the event was nationally announced, and drew some 7,000 visitors. It was the first time LinuxTag filled a whole building, and the last time it was held in Kaiserslautern. In the aftermath of the event, the LinuxTag association was founded.

Stuttgart 
In 2000 and 2001 LinuxTag was held in Stuttgart.

LinuxTag 2000 
LinuxTag 2000 was held at the Stuttgart exhibition center from 29 June to 2 July, and received up to 17,000 visitors. The conference included a business track for the first time, devoted to such topics as IT security, legal aspects of free software, and potential uses of Linux and the open-source concept in commercial applications. IT decision-makers were shown case studies in  applications of free software.

LinuxTag 2001 
LinuxTag 2001 took place at Stuttgart exhibition center from 5 to 8 July, with 14,870 visitors. The event was held under the patronage of the German Ministry of the Economy. Keynote speakers were Eric S. Raymond, Rob "Cmdr Taco" Malda from Slashdot and John "Maddog" Hall of Linux International.

Karlsruhe 

From 2002 to 2005, the LinuxTag conference and exhibition was held in Karlsruhe.

LinuxTag 2002 
LinuxTag was held in 2002 for the first time from 06.06.2002 to 09.02.2002 in the Karlsruhe Convention Centre. There were about 13,000 visitors. The motto of the conference was "Open your mind, open your heart, open your source!". About 100 exhibitors were at the exhibition.

LinuxTag 2003 

LinuxTag 2003 was titled Open Horizons and was held from 10 to 13 July for the second time in Karlsruhe in 2003.

 Together with the admission ticket for 10 euros, visitors received the LinuxTag for the first time available Knoppix DVD and a Tux Pin.  With 19,500 visitors, the number of visitors increased by 40 percent over the previous year.

As an exhibitor, both businesses and non-profit groups were represented. Apple showed Mac OS X in conjunction with open source. Around 150 exhibitors were there in 2003. Other highlights included the release of OpenGroupware.org on the model of OpenOffice.org as an open source and free conversion of several dozen Xbox s, some with hardware modification by two solder points, partially by importing the so-called MechInstallers on Linux.

There was also a Programming Competition, and on Sunday a world record attempt took 13 to 14 clock instead: On a server 100 Linux desktop sessions should with Gnome and KDE are simultaneously running. Here, everyone could join in on the Internet. The result was not disclosed.

Besides the exhibition also congresses were held in which renowned experts spoke on a subject group. There was, for example, a Debian conference and on Sunday there was a lecture on TCPA, followed by discussion. The Business and Administration Congress has enlarged with 400 participants by about 60%. The free lecture program was opened on Friday by the Parliamentary State Secretary, Federal Ministry of Economics and Labour (BMWA), Rezzo Schlauch. Keanote speaker were Jon "Maddog" Hall of Linux International, Georg Greve of Free Software Foundation Europe and Matthias Kalle Dalheimer of Klarälvdalens Datakonsult AB.

With Webcams you could also take a virtual visit to the fair. The Pingu-Cam (Tux of Penguin is the Linux mascot) showed pictures from the zoo of Karlsruhe, which is located right next to the fairgrounds.

LinuxTag 2004 

LinuxTag 2004 took place from 23 to 26 June for the third time in the congress center in Karlsruhe in 2004. Those who filed on the homepage, got in free. For 10 euro entry but you got a Tuxpin, a Knoppix DVD and a DVD with FreeBSD, NetBSD and OpenBSD.

LinuxTag 2004 had the slogan "Free source - free world". 16,175 visitors were counted. 
 
 
With the record number of about 170 exhibitors, among many freelance projects also numerous large and medium-sized enterprises were there. Hewlett-Packard was the third time Official Cornerstone Partner. Other major companies were the C & L Verlag, Intel, Novell, Oracle, SAP and Sun Microsystems. For the first time Microsoft was represented with a booth.

The one-day Business and Administration Congress on 24 June were presented in business and government case studies and success stories about the use of open source software. Among other things,  also the problem with Virus and worms  was an issue.

For the free conference, there was a record turnout with about 350 proposals from 20 countries. 130 thereof could be accommodated in the program. The issue of software patent was an important issue. For the first time the LPI 101 certification was possible at the LinuxTag. Contests on this LinuxTag were a coding marathon and Hacking Contest.

LinuxTag 2005 
LinuxTag 2005 took place in the period from 22 to 25 June held in the Congress Center Karlsruhe. LinuxTag 2005 was the 11th LinuxTag and  titled "Linux everywhere". In addition to the exhibition of different companies that have to do with Linux, more or less, there was once again in 2005, a presentation program. Also, the Business and Administration Congress took place on 22 June 2005  again. During the LinuxTag was the possibility to participate at various tutorials.

Jimmy Wales announced in his opening speech, the collaboration between Wikipedia and KDE. Through a web interface each program can directly access Wikipedia. The KDE Media Player Amarok can access the Wikipedia article of artists starting with version 1.3.

The organizer spoke of 12,000 visitors, which was mainly caused by the newly designed entrance fees and the hottest week of the year.

Wiesbaden 
2006 was the LinuxTag in Wiesbaden.

LinuxTag 2006 

LinuxTag 2006 took place from 3 to 6 May 2006 in the Rhein-Main-Hallen in Wiesbaden under the theme „See, what's ahead“
. According to organizers, over 9,000 people from over 30 nations attended LinuxTag 2006. There were many, often international lectures and various information booths, present among others were IBM, Avira and Sun Microsystems, but some others such as Hewlett-Packard or Red Hat were missing. Three teams participated the  hacking Contest.

The most visited lecture of the year was the Keynote of Ubuntu founder Mark Shuttleworth., The "chief dreamer of Ubuntu" referred to himself and the good cooperation of users with developers. He stressed that Kubuntu and Ubuntu should be treated equally and that there is a good cooperation between the developers. There was also the opportunity to pursue some of the lectures on a video stream, which was used by an estimated 1,800 people.

Berlin 
Since 2007, the LinuxTag in Berlin in the  Exhibition halls held under the Berlin Radio Tower.

LinuxTag 2007 
LinuxTag 2007 took place from 30 May to 2 June 2007 with the slogan "Come in: We're open" instead. It was attended by about 9600 people.

The event was held under the auspices of Interior Minister Wolfgang Schäuble.
 This sparked a result of the political attitude of the Minister of the Interior a lively discussion shaft from which to mushroom to Boykottierungsaufrufen LinuxTag. The uproar in the Linux community was so great that self-reported foreign pages about it.

LinuxTag 2008 
LinuxTag 2008 took place from 28 to 31 May at the Berlin Exhibition Grounds with 11,612 visitors. The second LinuxTag in the German capital was under the patronage of German Foreign Minister and Vice Chancellor Frank-Walter Steinmeier and is part of a six-day "IT Week in the Capital Region", which includes the fourth time in Berlin held IT business trade fair IT Profits under the patronage of the Federal Minister of Transport. At the same time the second German Asterisk day, the user and developer conference to Voice over IP, and the 8th @ Kit Congress to discuss legal issues of professional IT use. Important topics were "Highlights of digital lifestyle" and the "Mobile + Embedded Area".

LinuxTag 2009 
LinuxTag 2009 took place from 24 to 27 June on the Berlin Exhibition Grounds. He had more than 10,000 visitors. He is under the patronage of German Foreign Minister and Vice Chancellor Frank-Walter Steinmeier. The new president of Free Software Foundation Europe Karsten Gerloff attended LinuxTag. A focal point is the "image of business processes using Linux" and "Open Source in the colors of the tricolor," for which 14 open source suppliers from France showing their product and service range.

LinuxTag 2010 
LinuxTag 2010 was the 16th LinuxTag and took place from 9 to 12 June 2010 at the Berlin Exhibition Grounds. It was attended by about 11,600 people. He is under the patronage of Cornelia Rogall-Grothe, Federal Government Commissioner for Information Technology. Keynote speakers included Microsoft's general manager James Utzschneider who stunned the audience with his open approach to open source, the CEO of SugarCRM, Larry Augustin underlined the economic impact of OSS and the connection with the upcoming trend cloud computing, the open source Chef Google, Chris DiBona, underlined the high professional level of the Congress, the kernel developer Jonathan Corbet gave an outlook on the next Linux kernel 2.6.35 and Ubuntu founder Mark Shuttleworth staked out the milestones for Ubuntu desktops.

LinuxTag 2011 
The 17th LinuxTag was held from 11 to 14 May 2011 on the Berlin Exhibition Grounds with the slogan "Where .com meets .org". It was attended by 11,578 visitors and was under the patronage of Cornelia Rogall-Grothe of the Federal Government Commissioner for Information Technology. Keynotes were given by Wim Coekaerts (Oracle), Bradley Kuhn (Software Freedom Conservancy) and Daniel Walsh (Red Hat).

LinuxTag 2012 
The 18th LinuxTag was held from 23 to 26 May 2012 on the Berlin Exhibition Grounds with the motto "Open minds create effective solutions". He is under the patronage of Cornelia Rogall-Grothe of the Federal Government Commissioner for Information Technology. At LinuxTag the premiere of "Open MindManager Morning" took place, discussed on the industry experts and educators across the IT and changes in society, and philosophizing.

In addition, also found the premiere of the new lecture series "Open Minds Economy", organized by the Open Source Business Alliance and Messe Berlin, instead, presents the successful model of open source software in the fields of economy and society.

Keynotes were given by Jimmy Schulz, chairman of the project group "Interoperability, standards and open source" the Commission of Inquiry to Internet and digital society in the German Bundestag, Ulrich Drepper, maintainer of the GNU C standard library Glibc and Lars Knoll, employees at Nokia and Chief maintainer of the QT library.

LinuxTag 2013 
The 19 LinuxTag was held from 22 to 25 May 2013 embedded on the Berlin Exhibition Grounds with the motto "In the cloud - triumph of the free software goes on".
  He is under the patronage of Cornelia Rogall-Grothe of the Federal Government Commissioner for Information Technology.

It was held the premiere of Open IT Summit, which was organized as a parallel conference on LinuxTag of the Open Source Business Alliance (OSBA) and Messe Berlin with the goal to discuss the topic open source in the business environment. Also the OpenStack Day took place in cooperation with the OpenStack Foundation as a first major subconference on the subject OpenStack in Europe. The Foundation has its headquarters in the U.S. and sees itself as a global reservoir of the same name, scalable cloud management platform.

Keynotes were given by kernel developer Matthew Garrett on the subject of Unified Extensible Firmware Interface (UEFI) and Secure Boot and Benjamin Mako Hill, a researcher at the Massachusetts Institute of Technology, who called so-called anti Features unacceptable, where manufacturers to build restrictions into devices.

LinuxTag 2014 
In recent years, the number of visitors of LinuxTag stagnated despite more and more users of open-source programs. This decline in visitor numbers was interpreted as a side effect of the high market penetration of free software and Linux. In addition, for some years, there were many similar regional events, which have drawn from the concept of LinuxTag.

In order to adapt to the changes, the Linuxtag focused on the core issue of the professional use of open source software in 2014. Therefore, LinuxTag started a strategic partnership with the droidcon.

The 20th LinuxTag took place between 8 and 10 May 2014 in the STATION Berlin.
In spatial and temporal proximity were the Media Convention Berlin (May 6 to 7), the re: publica  (6 to 8 May) and the droidcon (8 to 10 May 2014). All events aimed towards a close relationship in order to achieve a high level of appreciation of the combined effort.

External links

Official LinuxTag website
German Official web page (with information in English as well)
The Knoppix project
OpenMusic, another LinuxTag-sponsored project.

References

Free-software events
Linux conferences
Recurring events established in 1996